Oran Park Raceway was a motor racing circuit at Narellan south west of Sydney, New South Wales, Australia which was operational from February 1962 until its closure in January 2010. The track was designed and started by George Murray and Jack Allen. Since its closure in 2010 it has been developed into housing.

History
The circuit was established by the Singer Car Club, with its opening meeting held on the weekend of 17–18 February 1962. The land for the circuit was provided by wealthy Camden grazier Dan Cleary, who also ran an earthmoving business, which provided the equipment used to help build the circuit. A motorcycle race meeting was held on 17 February 1963, with reigning Grand Prix Champion Jim Redman being the star attraction. Redman won nearly every class and set the lap record of 50.4 seconds, only 0.8 seconds slower than Frank Matich's outright time set in a 2.6-litre Lotus Sports Car.

The Grand Prix circuit featured a figure-eight shape with a bridge where the track crossed over itself. Despite the loop the racing direction was still regarded as being anticlockwise.

The complex also had a motocross track, a skidpan, a dirt track and four wheel drive course and a 1000-foot drag strip. Due to the nature of the land on which the circuit was built, most of the circuit was visible from the main grandstand or the grassed banks surrounding the track.

Oran Park was used regularly for rounds of the Australian Touring Car Championship, V8 Supercar Championship Series, Australian Drivers' Championship and Australian Sports Sedan Championship. The Australian Grand Prix was held at Oran Park in 1974 and 1977. In the 1970s the circuit attracted large crowds for the popular Toby Lee Series, initially run for Series Production Touring Cars and later for Sports Sedans. The inaugural Rothmans 500 for Touring Cars was staged in 1977 but the 1978 event was to be the second and last running of this endurance race. Shorter touring car endurance races would continue to be held at Oran Park during the 1980s and apart from the Sandown and Bathurst classics would last the longest before fading interest caused the compression of the endurance season to just those two events. The final such Oran Park enduro would be the 1989 Pepsi 300 won by Andrew Miedecke and Andrew Bagnall driving a Ford Sierra RS500. The final V8 Supercar round was held in December 2008, won by Garth Tander driving a Holden VE Commodore.

The land on which the racetrack was located was sold to the Government of New South Wales for a new housing development. This led to the eventual closure of the track and ended 48 years of motorsport heritage at the facility. The last motorcycle race meeting, the BelRay 6 Hour, was held on 21–22 November 2009. The final race meeting was scheduled for 23–24 January 2010 but was cancelled due to a lack of entries. This meant that the Independent Race Series event on 16 January 2010 was in fact the last race meeting to be held at the circuit. The circuit continued to run open track days, where the public could drive road cars and motorbikes around the full circuit. The last day before the track closed for good was Monday 25 January 2010.

Australian Grand Prix
Oran Park twice hosted the Australian Grand Prix during its 42 years of operation, with both events held for Formula 5000 cars. The first Grand Prix held at Oran Park in 1974 was won by Max Stewart driving a Lola T330 Chevrolet. The last time the circuit hosted the event was in 1977 when Warwick Brown drove his Lola T430 Chevrolet to victory. Alan Jones had actually 'won' the 1977 race on the road and was some 40 seconds ahead of Walker when he crossed the line for what should have been the finish. However he was penalised 60 seconds for jumping the start and would eventually be classified in 4th place.

Australian Touring Car Championship

Oran Park Raceway has hosted a round of the Australian Touring Car Championship every year since 1971. 2008 was the final year of Oran Park in the V8 Supercar Championship Series. Allan Moffat and Mark Skaife are the most successful drivers at Oran Park in the ATCC, with six round wins each.

The first ever race in 1971 saw Moffat in his Ford Boss 302 Mustang and Bob Jane driving his 427 cui powered Chevrolet Camaro ZL-1 go into the round on 31 and 34 points respectively with Moffat needing to either win or score more 3 or more points than Jane to claim the title. With both drivers starting from the front row a capacity crowd saw a titanic struggle with Jane claiming the win from Moffat and securing his 3rd ATCC championship. In a bizarre happening during the race, a spectator driving a road registered Valiant drove through an open gate and onto the circuit. As there were Group E cars in the race, the officials seemed to miss the extra car and the race continued with the driver managing to complete a few laps before exiting the circuit.

Touring Car round winners

Touring Car endurance races
A number of endurance races for Touring Cars were staged at Oran Park Raceway between 1977 and 1989.

Superbike World Championship
Oran Park twice played host to the Superbike World Championship. It hosted the second last round of the inaugural season of the championship in 1988, and also hosted the second last round in 1989 (since 1990 the Australian round has been held at the Phillip Island Grand Prix Circuit in Victoria).

Australia's future five time 500cc Motorcycle World Champion Mick Doohan easily won both races in 1988 on his Yamaha FZR750, while fellow Australians Peter Goddard and Michael Dowson won the 1989 rounds heat races also riding the Yahama FZR750.

A number of the international WSBK riders were critical of the Oran Park circuit, particularly of the fact that many of the concrete walls that lined the outside of the circuit (especially on the outside of turns 3, 4, 9 and 12) left little to no runoff room should a rider come off their bike.

NASCAR / AUSCAR
During the mid-1990s, the Australian NASCAR and AUSCAR series raced at Oran Park, utilising the  South Circuit, with the track's lights upgraded to allow for night racing. The night races at Oran Park were a popular addition to the series, which other than one-off support races at the Bathurst 1000 the Gold Coast Indy 300, had previously run exclusively on the only paved oval tracks in Australia, the Bob Jane owned Calder Park Thunderdome in Melbourne and the Speedway Super Bowl at the Adelaide International Raceway.

Lap records

As a comparison, in November 1974, Warwick Brown set the outright lap record on the then new "Grand Prix Circuit" with a 1:05.2 lap in a Lola T332 Formula 5000. Ten years later in August 1984, John Bowe set the outright lap record of 1:03.9 in a Ralt RT4 (1.6L) Formula Mondial. When the circuit closed in 2010, the outright lap record stood at 1:01.6718 by Tim Leahey in a Reynard 92D-Holden (3.8L) Formula Holden set in July 2000. Note that in mid-1984 the circuit was changed slightly with the addition of a straight run after turn 3 heading to what was turn 5 and eliminating what was turn 4. This made turn 3, and subsequently the new turn 4, slightly faster and gave the Grand Prix Circuit 12 corners instead of 13. The result was an overall improvement in lap times of approximately 0.5 to 1 second per lap. Motorbikes continued to use the pre-1984 sequence of turns until one year before the circuits closure.

The official race lap records at Oran Park Raceway are listed as:

Gallery

References

External links

Oran Park Track Days 
Oran Park Hot Laps 
Oran Park LIDAR

Former Supercars Championship circuits
Superbike World Championship circuits
Sports venues in Sydney
Defunct motorsport venues in Australia
Australian Grand Prix
Oran Park, New South Wales
Narellan, New South Wales